The 2006 Women's Rugby World Cup Final was a rugby union match that determined the 2006 Women's Rugby World Cup winner. The match took place on 17 September 2006 at the Commonwealth Stadium in Edmonton, Canada. It was contested between New Zealand and England for the second time in a row. It was England's fourth appearance in a Final and New Zealand's third. New Zealand won their third consecutive title after beating England 25–17.

Route to the final 

The pool stage of the 2006 World Cup was played in a cross-pool league system. Teams in Pool A competed against teams in Pool D, and Pool B teams competed against those in Pool C. New Zealand was in Pool A and played against Canada, Scotland and Samoa who were in Pool D. England was in Pool B and played France, the United States and South Africa from Pool C.

New Zealand played hosts, Canada, as they scored ten tries to begin their title defence. Canada only managed a converted try and couldn't stop the Black Ferns trouncing them 66–7. Samoa with their New Zealand based players were unsuccessful in scoring any points. Amiria Rule scored a hat-trick in the match as NewZealand scored 50 unanswered points. Scotland proved to be more resilient than Canada and Samoa as the Black Ferns were only able to score three tries. France were New Zealand's semifinal opponents and were defeated 40–10.

England beat inaugural champions, the United States, in the opening round of the World Cup 18–0 and then overwhelmed the South Africans 74–8. England's last pool game was against France, they won 27–8. England came too close for comfort in their semifinal against Canada, they barely scrapped by with a 10–6 win.

Match

Summary 
England dominated the first half of a tough match. English fly-half Karen Andrew scored the first points of the game after she successfully kicked a penalty in the third minute. New Zealand later equalized just before the 30th minute after a missed penalty earlier in the ninth. Two minutes before halftime Black Ferns Lock Monalisa Codling scored a try that put them in the lead 10–3 with a successful conversion from Scrum-half Emma Jensen. Stephanie Mortimer increased the Black Ferns lead to 15–3 with a try at the start of the second half. In the 49th minute England was awarded a penalty try and Karen Andrew's conversion brought them within five points of New Zealand, the score now 15–10. Victoria Heighway scored another try for the Black Ferns to make it 20–10. Helen Clayton scored England's last try and Shelley Rae converted it to bring the points to 20–17. Amiria Marsh's try sealed the deal for New Zealand as they celebrated their 25–17 victory and third World Cup  title.

Notes

References 

Final
New Zealand women's national rugby union team
England women's national rugby union team
2006 in New Zealand rugby union
2006–07 in English rugby union
2006 in New Zealand women's sport
2006 in English women's sport
Women's rugby union matches
2006
September 2006 sports events in Canada